The Vega EVX is an all-electric battery-powered two-seater AWD sports car developed by Sri Lankan automobile manufacturer Vega Innovations and is planned to enter production in 2022. This car is the first sports car to be manufactured in Sri Lanka and the first all electric sports car to be manufactured in south Asia.

Development

In 2013 Vega Innovations was founded by Dr. Harsha Subasinghe and co-founder Dr Beshan Kulapala. In 2017 the first Vega EVX prototype was built with the company expecting commercial production to begin over the coming years. The Production is only limited to 25 units.

Introduction

The serial version prototype of the Vega EVX was to be presented at the Geneva Motor Show in March 2020 but was canceled due to the COVID-19 pandemic. However, the car was unveiled in a live stream at the Geneva Motor Show in 2020.

Specifications and Performance

References 

Electric sports cars
First car made by manufacturer
Cars introduced in 2020
Vehicles of Sri Lanka